Landhi Town was a Karachi borough in the eastern part of the city that was named after the locality of Landhi. Landhi Town was formed in 2001 as part of The Local Government Ordinance 2001, and was subdivided into 9 union councils. The town system was disbanded in 2011, and Korangi Town was re-organized as part of Karachi East District, before Korangi District was formed.

Location 
It is bordered by the Faisal Cantonment and Shah Faisal Town to the north across the Malir River, Bin Qasim Town to the south and east, and Korangi Town to the west. The population of Landhi Town was estimated to be over 660,000 at the 1998 census, of which 99% are Muslim. Sindhis and Pashtuns constitute an overwhelming majority of the population, followed by Muhajirs and Baloch.

History 
Landhi Town contained much of the oldest parts of Karachi.  The federal government under Pervez Musharraf, who seized power in a 1999 coup d'état, introduced local government reforms in the year 2000, which eliminated the previous "third tier of government" (administrative divisions) and replaced it with the fourth tier (districts). The effect in Karachi was the dissolution of the former Karachi Division, and the merging of its five districts to form a new Karachi City-District with eighteen autonomous constituent towns including Landhi Town. In 2011,Despite being abolished, the system was nevertheless used for administrative purposes up to 2015, when the Karachi Metropolitan Corporation system was reintroduced. In 2015, Landhi Town was re-organized as part of Karachi East, before it was made part of Korangi District.

Neighbourhoods 
 Awami Colony
 Bhutto Nagar is named after former Prime Minister Zulfikar Ali Bhutto, a Sindhi.
 Sher Pao Colony
 Dawood Chowrangi
 Khawaja Ajmeer Colony  is named after Khwaja Moinuddin Chishti of Ajmer.
 Burmee Colony is named for the Rohingya refugees who hail from Myanmar (formerly Burma).
 Korangi lies on the eastern side of Karachi between Karachi and Keti Bandar – the area extending from Korangi to Rehri Creek.
 Landhi is home to Babar Market, one of Asia's largest open air markets. Landhi railway station is also located in this area.
 Moinabad
 Muslimabad
 Majeed Colony
 Muzafarabad
 Sharafi Goth
 Sherabad

See also 
 Landhi Industrial Area
 City District Government
 Karachi
 Lahore

References

External links 
 
 Landhi Town - archived

 
Korangi District
Towns in Karachi